Upper Soudley Halt railway station is a disused railway station that was opened by the Great Western Railway (GWR) on the former Bullo Pill Railway, later known as the GWR Forest of Dean Branch.

History

The station - serving the village of Soudley; was located at 2 miles 16 chains from Newnham and opened when passenger services were introduced on 3 August 1907. From the outset the station (which had been built on a 1 in 66 gradient) was provided with a wooden fronted platform and a GWR Pagoda type hut. This platform was situated on the up (eastern) side of the line, adjacent to the public highway and was rebuilt from its original height of 1 foot 2 inches to the standard height of 3 feet during November 1908 (similar alterations were also made to other platforms on the line).

The platform, as well as being accessible from the public highway, could also be accessed from the former Bullo Pill Tramway (locally known as the Dram Road) which was latterly used as a footpath, but there is no record of a boarded crossing over the track ever being provided at that location. In the later years, crews working down trains (uphill towards Bilson) claimed to have run short on steam and regularly abandoned their trains on the unofficial foot crossing; conveniently located next to the White Horse Public House.

Services

References

Further reading

Disused railway stations in Gloucestershire
Former Great Western Railway stations
Railway stations in Great Britain opened in 1907
Railway stations in Great Britain closed in 1958